Bachpan (Hindi: बचपन, Childhood) is a 1945 Hindi drama film directed by Homi Wadia. It was produced by Homi Wadia's Basant Films and had music by S. N. Tripathi. The film starred Mazhar Khan, Chandraprabha, Shashi Kapoor Sr., Gulab, Dalpat, Baby Shakuntala, Dixit, Baby Madhuri.

Cast
 Mazhar Khan
 Baby Madhuri
 Chandraprabha
 Nandrekar
 Dixit
 Shakuntala
 Gulab
 Dalpat
 Shashi Kapoor

Music
The film's music was composed by S. N. Tripathi, with lyrics written by I. C. Kapoor.

Song List

References

External links

1945 films
1940s Hindi-language films
Indian black-and-white films
Films directed by Homi Wadia
Indian drama films
1945 drama films
Hindi-language drama films